The 1988 Dunlop RAC British Touring Car Championship was the 31st season of the championship. The drivers title was won by Frank Sytner, driving a BMW Team Finance BMW M3. Second place overall was Phil Dowsett who dominated class D. Andy Rouse finished third on points, winning nine races outright of the twelve rounds.

Teams & Drivers